Richard Gross may refer to:
Dick Gross (born 1954), Australian politician
Richard Gross (sculptor) (1882–1964), New Zealand sculptor